KGKG (1340 AM) is a radio station broadcasting a 1980's hits format. Licensed to Salida, Colorado, United States, the station is currently owned by Headwaters Media, L.L.C.

KGKG began broadcasting in 1948 as KVRH, and is the first station to be broadcast in the Upper Arkansas Valley. In 2003, it was flipped to an oldies format, then on April 1, 2009, the station was flipped to a news/talk station.

On November 1, 2009, KVRH changed their format from talk to adult standards. In 2011, after KWUZ flipped its format from a classic hits format, to Hippie Radio format, KVRH flipped its format to classic country. KVRH along with sister station KBVC carries Denver Broncos football via 850 KOA with Dave Logan and Ed McCaffrey.

The station changed its call sign to the current KGKG on June 29, 2017.

On January 1, 2021, KGKG changed their format from classic rock to 1980's hits, branded as "The Valley 102.9".

Previous logo

References

External links

GKG